The 2006 Burlington mayoral election was the first election in Burlington, Vermont to use instant-runoff voting (also known as "IRV"). The mayoral incumbent (Peter Clavelle) had served continuously since 1995, and was first elected mayor in 1989.

Bob Kiss was elected mayor of Burlington on March 7, 2006. In the election, he prevailed over opponents Hinda Miller (Democratic Party), Kevin Curley (Republican Party), Louis Beaudin (Independent), and Loyal Ploof (Green Party). Kiss became the second Vermont Progressive to be elected to the office, after Clavelle.

Candidates 

The candidates for this race were:

 Bob Kiss - from the Vermont Progressive Party, who finished first
 Hinda Miller - from the Democratic Party, who finished second
 Kevin Curley - from the Republican Party, who finished third

Bob Kiss 

Bob Kiss was a member of the Vermont House of Representatives from January 2001 until he stepped down to assume office as mayor of Burlington following his election to that office on March 7, 2006. He is a member of the Vermont Progressive Party and one of roughly a dozen Progressives who had held seats in the Vermont General Assembly.

Kiss won the election, ranked highest on nearly 39% of the ballots in the first round of counting, and defeating the nearest opponent (Hinda Miller) with over 54% of the final round ballots.

Hinda Miller 

Hinda Miller was a Democratic member of the Vermont State Senate, representing the Chittenden senate district. Miller is also known for her part in the invention of the sports bra.

Hinda Miller was first elected to the Vermont State Senate in 2002 and left office in 2013.  Miller lost the election to Kiss, though she advanced to the final round of counting because her nearest opponent (Kevin Curley) was eliminated in a prior round.

Kevin Curley 
Kevin Curley was the Republican candidate for mayor in 2006.  Curley was eliminated before Kiss and Miller because he received less than 27% of the first round of votes, and not enough of the 176 ballots from the opponents eliminated before him (from voters that preferred Louis Beaudin or Loyal Ploof) transferred to Curley.

Results

Kiss as mayor 

Kiss was elected mayor of Burlington on March 7, 2006 by prevailing over opponents Miller and Curley. With his election, Kiss became the second Vermont Progressive to be elected to the office (his predecessor Peter Clavelle was the first). Vermont's Independent U.S. Senator Bernie Sanders, who is associated with the party but not a member, had been last elected as Burlington's mayor in Burlington's 1987 mayoral election. During Kiss's re-election campaign in 2009, he was endorsed by Sanders.  

Mayor Kiss won the 2009 mayoral election to earn a second term as Burlington mayor. However, there was controversy surrounding the election. Kiss earned reelection by edging out Republican City Council President Kurt Wright in the third round of instant-runoff voting, receiving only 29% of the first-round votes (compared to Wright's 33%).  Both Kiss and Wright squeezed out Democratic Party candidate Andy Montroll in the first round, who (according to the rankings on the ballots) was ranked higher than Kiss and Wright on more ballots than either. A few months after the mayoral election, the City of Burlington repealed instant-runoff voting.

After re-election, Kiss and the City of Burlington faced significant challenges related to Burlington Telecom. In addition, Burlington was sued in federal court by Citibank, related to the lease-purchase agreement for Burlington Telecom, since the city owes Citibank over $33 million.   In November 2011, Kiss announced that he would not run in the 2012 Burlington mayoral election to secure his third term as Mayor of Burlington.  Kiss announced in May 2012 he would run as an independent for the Vermont Senate. Kiss finished 8th of 14 candidates running for six seats.

References 

Burlington, Vermont
2006
Burlington Mayor